Marghubur Rahman Bijnori (1914 – 8 December 2010) was an Indian Muslim scholar and Vice-Chancellor of Darul Uloom Deoband.

Biography
Rahmān was born in Bijnor in 1914. He was an alumnus of Darul Uloom Deoband. He died on 8 December 2010 in Bijnor.

References

1914 births
2010 deaths
Darul Uloom Deoband alumni
Vice-Chancellors of Darul Uloom Deoband
Academic staff of Darul Uloom Deoband
Hanafis
Deobandis
20th-century Indian Muslims
21st-century Indian Muslims
Indian Sunni Muslim scholars of Islam
People from Bijnor
People from Bijnor district